Niels-Henning Ørsted Pedersen (27 May 1946 – 19 April 2005) was a Danish jazz double bassist.

Discography

As leader
 Paul Bley/NHØP with Paul Bley (SteepleChase, 1973)
 Duo with Kenny Drew (SteepleChase, 1973)
 Duo 2 with Kenny Drew (SteepleChase, 1974)
 Two's Company with Joe Albany (SteepleChase, 1974)
 Jaywalkin' (SteepleChase, 1975)
 Duo Live in Concert with Kenny Drew (SteepleChase, 1975)
 Movability with Martial Solal (MPS, 1976)
 Double Bass with Sam Jones (SteepleChase, 1976)
 Pictures with Kenneth Knudsen (SteepleChase, 1977)
 In Concert with Kenny Drew (SteepleChase, 1979)
 Dancing on the Tables (SteepleChase, 1979)
 Goin' Straight with Edgar Wilson (MPS, 1979)
 Tania Maria & Niels Henning Orsted Pedersen (Medley, 1979)
 Four Keys (MPS) with Martial Solal, Lee Konitz, John Scofield (MPS, 1979)
 Chops with Joe Pass (Pablo, 1979)
 Just the Way You Are with Rune Gustafsson (Sonet, 1980)
 Northsea Nights with Joe Pass (Pablo, 1980)
 Looking at Bird with Archie Shepp (SteepleChase, 1981)
 The Viking with Philip Catherine (Pablo, 1983)
 Trinity with Boulou Ferre, Elios Ferre (SteepleChase, 1983)
 Face to Face with Tete Montoliu (SteepleChase, 1984)
 With a Little Help from My Friend(s) with Claes Crona (Skivbolaget, 1985)
 With Joy and Feelings with Ulla Neumann (Four Leaf Clover, 1985)
 The Eternal Traveller (Pablo, 1984)
 Threesome with Monty Alexander, Grady Tate (Soul Note, 1986)
 Heart to Heart with Mikkelborg/Knudsen (Storyville, 1986)
 Play with Us with Louis Hjulmand (Olufsen, 1987)
 Duologue with Allan Botschinsky (MA Music, 1987)
 Latin Alley with Alain Jean-Marie (IDA, 1988)
 Copenhagen Groove with Moller/Clausen/Cobb (Stunt, 1989)
 Three for the Road with Guitars Unlimited (Sonet, 1989)
 Homage/Once Upon a Time with Mikkelborg (Sonet, 1990)
 Uncharted Land (Pladecompagniet, 1992)
 Spanish Nights with Philip Catherine (Enja, 1992)
 Art of the Duo with Philip Catherine (Enja, 1993)
 Ambiance with Danish Radio Big Band (Dacapo, 1994)
 Misty Dawn with Doky/Riel (Columbia, 1994)
 Scandinavian Wood (Caprice, 1995)
 Those Who Were (Verve, 1996)
 Elegies Mostly with Dick Hyman (Gemini, 1996)
 Friends Forever featuring Renee Rosnes (Milestone, 1997) – recorded in 1995
 This Is All I Ask (Verve, 1998) – recorded in 1997
 In the Name of Music with Trio Rococo (BMG, 1998)
 The Duets with Mulgrew Miller (Bang & Olufsen, 1999)
 Breaking the Ice with Floris Nico Bunink (BV Haast, 1999)
 Grundtvigs Sang Til Livet with Ole Kock Hansen (Vartov, 2000)
 The Duo Live! with Mulgrew Miller (Storyville, 2016)

As sideman
With Svend Asmussen
 Telemann Today (Polydor, 1976)
 Prize/Winners (Matrix, 1978)
 Sven Asmussen at Slukafter (Phontastic, 1989)

With Chet Baker
 The Touch of Your Lips (SteepleChase, 1979)
 No Problem (SteepleChase, 1979)
 Daybreak (SteepleChase, 1979)
 This Is Always (SteepleChase, 1982)
 Someday My Prince Will Come (SteepleChase, 1983)

With Dexter Gordon
 One Flight Up (Blue Note, 1964 [1965])
 Cheese Cake (SteepleChase, 1964 [1979])
 I Want More (SteepleChase, 1964 [1980])
 Love for Sale (SteepleChase, 1964 [1982])
 It's You or No One (SteepleChase, 1964 [1983])
 Billie's Bounce (SteepleChase, 1964 [1983])
 Loose Walk (SteepleChase, 1965 [2003])
 Heartaches (SteepleChase, 1965 [2004])
 Misty (SteepleChase, 1965 [2004])
 Ladybird (SteepleChase, 1965 [2005])
 Stella by Starlight (SteepleChase, 1966 [2005])
 Both Sides of Midnight (Black Lion, 1967 [1988])
 Body and Soul (Black Lion, 1967 [1988])
 Take the "A" Train (Black Lion, 1967 [1989])
 Jazz at Highschool (Storyville, 1967 [2002])
 A Day in Copenhagen (MPS, 1969)
 The Apartment (SteepleChase, 1974 [1975])
 More Than You Know (SteepleChase, 1975)
 Stable Mable (SteepleChase, 1975)
 Something Different (SteepleChase, 1975 [1980])
 Bouncin' with Dex (SteepleChase, 1975 [1976])
 Swiss Nights Vol. 1 (SteepleChase, 1975 [1976])
 Swiss Nights Vol. 2 (SteepleChase, 1975 [1978])
 Swiss Nights Vol. 3 (SteepleChase, 1975 [1979])
 Lullaby for a Monster (SteepleChase, 1976 [1981])

With Stephane Grappelli
 Two of a Kind (Metronome, 1965) (Stephane Grappelli and Svend Asmussen)
 Young Django (MPS, 1979)
 Tivoli Gardens Copenhagen Denmark (Pablo, 1980)
 Live 1992 (Birdology, 1992)

With Oscar Peterson
 Great Connection (MPS, 1971 [1974])
 The Good Life (Pablo, 1973)
 The Trio  (Pablo, 1974)
 Oscar Peterson and the Bassists – Montreux '77 (Pablo, 1977)
 The Paris Concert: Salle Pleyel, 1978 (Pablo, 1979)
 Nigerian Marketplace (Pablo, 1981)
 Night Child (Pablo, 1982)
 Skol (Pablo, 1982)
 Oscar Peterson Meets Roy Hargrove and Ralph Moore (Telarc, 1996)
 A Tribute to Oscar Peterson Live at the Town Hall (Telarc, 1997)
 Jazz in Paris (Verve, 2001)

With others
 Sahib Shihab, "Sahib Shihab and the Danish Radio Jazz Group" (Oktav, 1965)
 Charly Antolini, On the Beat (Bell, 1993)
 Count Basie, Count Basie Jam Session at the Montreux Jazz Festival 1975 (Pablo, 1975)
 Paquito D'Rivera, Hasta Siempre (Plane Jazz, 1978)
 Niels Lan Doky, Here or There (Storyville, 1986)
 Niels Lan Doky, The Target (Storyville, 1987)
 Kenny Drew, Kenny Drew Live (Keystone, 1998)
 Atilla Engin, Melo Perquana (Olufsen, 1988)
 Ella Fitzgerald, Count Basie, Joe Pass Digital III at Montreux (Pablo, 1980)
 Stan Getz, Live at Montmartre (SteepleChase, 1977)
 Rune Gustafsson, String Along with Basie (Sonet, 1989)
 Roy Haynes, My Shining Hour (Storyville, 1995)
 Maria Joao, Alice (Enja, 1992)
 Duke Jordan, Double Duke (SteepleChase, 1997)
 Karin Krog, Open Space (MPS, 1969)
 Karin Krog with Dexter Gordon, Some Other Spring (Sonet, 1970)
 Bireli Lagrene, Standards (Blue Note, 1992)
 Didier Lockwood, New World (MPS, 1979)
 Dado Moroni, Bluesology (Dire, 1981)
 Brew Moore, Zonky (SteepleChase, 2005)
 Joe Pass, What's New (Jazzette, 1992)
 Michel Petrucciani, Petrucciani NOHP (Dreyfus, 2009)
 Martial Solal, Suite for Trio (MPS, 1978)
 Toots Thielemans & Joe Pass, Live in the Netherlands (Pablo, 1982)
 Magni Wentzel, Come Away with Me (Gemini, 1994)

Notes

References 
"Scandinavian Wood": The musical career of Niels-Henning Ørsted Pedersen in the light of his discography by Jørgen Mathiasen. Books on Demand 2010. .

External links
Official website
Niels-Henning Orsted Pedersen – Danish virtuoso bassist who kept pace with Oscar Peterson by John Fordham, 21 May 2005, at The Guardian

Jazz discographies